Pursuit of the Graf Spee is a 1982 video game published by Strategic Simulations for the Apple II.

Gameplay
Pursuit of the Graf Spee is a game in which one of the 1939 conflicts of World War II is simulated.

Pursuit of the Graf Spee, uses an altered version of Computer Bismarcks core system.

Reception
William Edmunds reviewed the game for Computer Gaming World, and stated that "The Pursuit of the Graf Spee is a good intermediate level war game. It combines a strategic game, its anguish of unsuccessful searching, with tactical battles which can produce the thrill of battle when you're finally closing in for the kill. This game characterizes many of the aspects of naval combat while being fast paced and easy to play."

Reviews
 Casus Belli #13 (Feb 1983)

References

External links
Review in Softline
Article in Electronic Games
Review in Tilt

1982 video games
Apple II games
Apple II-only games
Computer wargames
Naval video games
Strategic Simulations games
Turn-based strategy video games
Video games developed in the United States
World War II video games